Nakhshiri Saint Panagia Church is a church ruins in the village of Nakhshiri, Sokhumi municipality, Autonomous Republic of Abkhazia, Georgia. In the same village there is also the 20th century Saint Ilya Church.

History 
The church was built in the Middle Ages. The church walls are in a poor physical condition and need an urgent conservation.

References 

Religious buildings and structures in Georgia (country)
Religious buildings and structures in Abkhazia
Churches in Abkhazia